This list charts the most successful films at cinemas in Austria by admissions. Der Schuh des Manitu (2001) is the highest-grossing movie in Austria with over 2 million admissions.

Highest-grossing films 
This table ranks films released in Austria by revenue though not adjusted for inflation.

Adjusted for inflation

Most successful films by admissions
The table below lists the most successful films in Austria in terms of admissions.

Most successful Austrian films
The table below lists the most successful Austrian films in Austria in terms of admissions since 1982.

Most weeks at number one

See also
Lists of highest-grossing films

References 
Total includes 8,180 admissions of the 2023 25th anniversary re-release.
Total includes 32,048 admissions of the 2022 remastered re-release.
Total includes 10,741 admissions of the 3D Anniversary Version.

Austria
Austrian film-related lists